Mikhail Matveyevich Stasyulevich (Михаи́л Матве́евич Стасюле́вич, August 28, 1826, Saint Petersburg, Russia – January 23, 1911, Saint Petersburg, Russia) was a Russian writer, scholar, historian, journalist, editor and publisher.

Biography
Mikhail Stasyulevich was born in Saint Petersburg to the family of a doctor. Having graduated the Saint Petersburg University's Philology faculty in 1847, five years later he was invited to teach the children of the Russian monarch's family and in 1860-1862 was a personal history tutor for tsesarevich Nikolai Alexandrovich.

In 1861 Stasyulevich, then a professor of history, demonstratively resigned his professorship (alongside four Saint Petersburg University colleagues, Konstantin Kavelin, Alexander Pypin, Włodzimierz Spasowicz and Boris Utin) in protest against the prosecution of the students who took part in the 1861 unrest.

Stasyulevich is best known as the founder (in 1866) and editor-in-chief (1866–1909) of Vestnik Evropy, one of Russia's leading literary magazines of the time. He was also the author of numerous articles on contemporary Russian literature, and later literary memoirs (on  Ivan Goncharov and Aleksey K. Tolstoy, among others). In the Soviet times Stasyulevich's name was forgotten. His grave in the Voskresenskaya church was destroyed in the late 1920s, as well as the church itself. The first comprehensive study of his legacy, A Man of His Times, was written by Viktor Kelner and published in 1993.

Selected works 
 A History of the Middle Ages in Writings of the Time and Modern Day Studies / История средних веков в ее писателях и исследованиях новейших ученых (Vol. 1—3, Saint Petersburg, 1863—65)
 A Study in Review of the Philosophy of History's Basic Systems / Опыт исторического обзора главных систем философии истории (Saint Petersburg, 1866)

Bibliography 
 М. М. Стасюлевич и его современники в их переписке / M. M. Stasyulevich. Correspondence With the Contemporaries. Vols. 1—5, Saint Petersburg, 1911—1913.
 Kelner, Viktor. Человек своего времени / A man of His Times. Russian national Library. 1993. .

References

External links

1826 births
1911 deaths
Writers from Saint Petersburg
People from Sankt-Peterburgsky Uyezd
Party of Democratic Reform (Russia) politicians
Russian journalists
19th-century historians from the Russian Empire
Russian editors
Russian publishers (people)